The Battle of the Kondurcha River was the first major battle of the Tokhtamysh–Timur war. It took place at the Kondurcha River, in the  Bulgar Ulus of the Golden Horde, in what today is Samara Oblast in Russia. Tokhtamysh's cavalry tried to encircle Timur's army from the flanks. However, the Central Asian army withstood the assault, after which its sudden frontal attack put the Horde troops to flight. However, many of the Golden Horde troops escaped to fight again at Terek.

Timur had previously assisted Tokhtamysh in taking the throne of the White Horde in 1378. In the following years both men grew in power, with Tokhtamysh taking full control of the Golden Horde while Timur expanded his power all over the Middle East. However Timur took Azerbaijan, which Tokhtamysh believed was rightfully Golden Horde territory. He invaded Timurid territory, briefly besieging Samarkand before being chased off by Timur. Timur pursued Tokhtamysh until the latter turned to fight him next to the Kondurcha River.

References

Kondurcha River
Kondurcha River
the Kondurcha River
1391 in Europe